The yellow bromeliad frog (Osteopilus marianae), or Spaldings tree frog, is a species of frog in the family Hylidae endemic to central Jamaica. Its natural habitats are old-growth pine and deciduous forests where it is found in bromeliads. Eggs are also laid in bromeliads. It is threatened by habitat loss (deforestation).

References

Osteopilus
Amphibians of Jamaica
Endemic fauna of Jamaica
Endangered fauna of North America
Taxonomy articles created by Polbot
Amphibians described in 1826